The women's single sculls (W1x) rowing competition at the 1984 Summer Olympics took place at Lake Casitas in Ventura County, California, United States. It was held from 30 July to 4 August.

Background
Like all other rowing events at the 1984 Summer Olympics, the result was influenced by the absence of strong competitors due to the Eastern Bloc boycott. The last two world champions from the Soviet Union and East Germany were absent; Irina Fetisova of the Soviet Union had won the 1982 World Rowing Championships in Switzerland, and East German Jutta Behrendt had become world champion in 1983. Sanda Toma, the winner of the 1980 Olympic event and 1981 world champion, had since retired. World championship medallists competing in this event were Beryl Mitchell from Great Britain, who had come second in 1981, and Valeria Răcilă of Romania and Stephanie Foster of New Zealand, who had won silver and bronze in 1982, respectively. Of all those, the Romanian was regarded as the favourite. Another competitor to be regarded as one of the favourites was María Fernanda de la Fuente of Mexico, who had come second in the 1983 Pan American Games.

Previous W1x competitions

Results

Heats
The winner of each heat advanced to the semi-finals. All others went to the repechage. The heats were raced on 30 July.

Heat 1

Heat 2

Heat 3

Repechage
The first three of each heat advanced to the semi-final. The remaining rowers were eliminated from the competition. The repechages were raced on 1 August. The Italian rower, Antonella Corazza, did not compete in the repechage, but replaced Paola Grizzetti in the quadruple sculls team instead (in both the repechage on 1 August, and the final on 4 August).

Heat 1

Heat 2

Heat 3

Semi-finals
The top three from each heat advanced to the A final. The others advanced to the B final. The semi-finals were raced on 2 August.

Heat 1

Heat 2

Finals

B final
The B final was raced on 3 August.

A final
The A final was raced on 4 August.

Notes

References 
 
Volume 1 Part 1
Volume 1 Part 2
Volume 1 Part 3
 
Volume 2 Part 1
Volume 2 Part 2
Volume 2 Part 3 (page 469 onwards)

Women's single sculls
Rowing at the 1984 Summer Olympics